Armando Palacio Valdés (4 October 185329 January 1938) was a Spanish novelist and critic.

Biography
Armando Francisco Bonifacio Palacio y Rodríguez-Valdés was born at Entralgo in the province of Asturias on 4 October 1853, eldest son of Silverio Palacio y Cárcaba, a lawyer, and Eduarda Rodríguez-Valdés y Alas, a aristocrat. His brothers, Atanasio and Leopoldo, also were writers.

His first writings were printed in the Revista Europea. These were pungent essays, remarkable for independent judgment and refined humour, and found so much favor with the public that the young beginner was soon appointed editor of the Revista. The best of his critical work is collected in Los Oradores del Ateneo (1878), Los Novelistas españoles (1878), Nuevo viaje al Parnaso and La Literatura en 1881 (1882), this last being written in collaboration with Leopoldo Alas.

In 1881 he published a novel, El señorito Octavio, which shows an uncommon power of observation, and the optimistic promise of better things to come. In Marta y Maria (1883), a portrayal of the struggle between religious vocation and earthly passion, somewhat in the manner of Valera, Palacio Valdés achieved a popular triumph.

According to a contemporaneous assessment by James Fitzmaurice-Kelly in the Encyclopædia Britannica Eleventh Edition:

A collection of his short stories appeared in English translation in 1935.

Works

Semblanzas literarias (1871) 
Los oradores del Ateneo (1878)
El nuevo viaje al Parnaso (1879)
La literatura en (1881), with Leopoldo Alas 
El señorito Octavio (1881)
Marta y María (1883)
Aguas fuertes (1884)
El idilio de un enfermo (1884)
José (1885)
Riverita (1886)
Maximina (1887)
El cuarto poder (1888)
La hermana San Sulpicio (1889)
La espuma (1890)
La espuma (1891)
La fe (1892)
El maestrante (1893)
El Orígen del Pensamiento(1893)
Los majos de Cádiz (1896)
La alegría del capitán Ribot (1899)  ("The Joy of Captain Ribot", 1900)
Tristán o el pesimismo (1906)
La aldea perdida (1911)
Los papeles del doctor Angélico (1911)
Años de juventud del doctor Angélico (1918)
La novela de un novelista (1921)
Cuentos escogidos (1923)
La hija de Natalia (1924)
El pájaro en la nieve y otros cuentos (1925)
Santa Rogelia (1926)
Los cármenes de Granada (1927)
Testamento literario (1929)
Sinfonía pastoral (1930)
El gobierno de las mujeres (1931)
Obras completas (1935)
Álbum de un viejo (1940)
El Crimen en Calle de la Perseguida (Unknown)

See also

In English
Literary realism: General vision of the movement
Spanish literature: Evolution of Spanish literature

In Spanish
wikisource:es:Armando Palacio Valdés
:es:Literatura española del Realismo

References

Diccionario de literatura española. Madrid: Revista de Occidente, 1964.

External links
 
 
 

1853 births
1938 deaths
Spanish male writers
People from Asturias
Members of the Royal Spanish Academy
University of Oviedo alumni